Robert Arthur "Steady" Falkenberg (born January 1, 1946) is a Canadian retired professional ice hockey defenceman who played 54 games in the National Hockey League with the Detroit Red Wings between 1966 and 1971 and 378 games in the World Hockey Association with Alberta/Edmonton Oilers, and San Diego Mariners between 1972 and 1978.

Playing career
During his eight seasons with the Wings, Falkenberg spent the majority of his time with their farm teams in the minor professional leagues (American Hockey League, Central Hockey League). Falkenberg jumped to the new WHA for its inaugural (1972–73) season, where he consistently played the next five seasons with the Alberta Oilers (renamed Edmonton in their second season), then the Mariners. He retired from hockey after a brief two games, back with the Oilers, at the start of his sixth WHA season (1977–78).

Career statistics

Regular season and playoffs

External links
 

1946 births
Living people
People from the County of Stettler No. 6
Baltimore Clippers players
Canadian ice hockey defencemen
Cleveland Barons (1937–1973) players
Detroit Red Wings players
Edmonton Oil Kings (WCHL) players
Edmonton Oilers (WHA) players
Ice hockey people from Alberta
Pittsburgh Hornets players
San Diego Mariners players
Tidewater Wings players